José Gutiérrez (born 12 October 1992) is a Venezuelan competitive sailor. He competed at the 2016 Summer Olympics in Rio de Janeiro, in the men's Laser class.

References

1992 births
Living people
Venezuelan male sailors (sport)
Olympic sailors of Venezuela
Sailors at the 2016 Summer Olympics – Laser
Sailors at the 2015 Pan American Games
Pan American Games competitors for Venezuela
21st-century Venezuelan people